The du Maurier Classic was a women's major championship from 1979 till 2000, and is still a LPGA Tour golf tournament called the Canadian Women's Open, which has been in existence since 1973. This event has always conducted in stroke play competition by the Royal Canadian Golf Association (RCGA).

Pat Bradley holds the record for the most victories when the tournament was a major, with three, and Bradley had the most consecutive wins with two. The lowest under-par and aggregate score achieved while a major was Brandie Burton's 270 (–18) in 1998, which just happened to be her second duMaurier Classic win and only the second along with Bradley to ever accomplish the feat.

Key

Champions

Multiple champions
This table lists the golfers who have won more than one du Maurier Classic as a major championship. Bolded years and player name indicates consecutive victories.

Champions by nationality

This table lists the total number of titles won by golfers of each nationality as a major.

Notes
 This tournament had two name changes, which are the following; 1979–1983 Peter Jackson Classic and 1984–2000 duMaurier Classic.
 Pat Bradley won in a sudden death playoff over Ayako Okamoto, 2-3.
 Brandie Burton won in a sudden death playoff over Betsy King, 3-4.

See also
Chronological list of LPGA major golf champions
List of LPGA major championship winning golfers
Grand Slam (golf)

References
General

Specific

External links
 Canadian Women's Open: 2009 Media Guide

Du